

Urbain François Dubois (26 May 1818 – 14 March 1901) was a French chef who is best known as the author of a series of recipe books that became classics of French Cuisine, and as the creator of Veal Orloff, a popular dish in Russian cuisine.  He is credited with introducing service à la russe to Western European dining, and the term chef.

Career 
Dubois, the son of a master weaver, was born in Trets in the  Bouches-du-Rhône Department of France. He trained as a chef by working in the kitchen of his uncle's hotel. His uncle, Jean Dubois, had served as a chef for General Bertrand. In 1840, Urbain Dubois moved to Paris but then in around 1845 he left the capital to travel and work as a chef in several countries in central Europe before becoming chef to Prince Alexey Orlov, an ambassador for Nicholas I of Russia.  He is credited with introducing the now conventional service à la russe (in which dishes are served sequentially, instead of all at once) to Western Europe.  This style of service required a menu — so that guests could gauge their appetite — and a person in charge of it, who Dubois called the chef, not until then a conventional term.

In 1860 he became chef in Berlin to the Prince regent, William of Prussia, who would become king in the following year. In 1870, at the start of the Franco-Prussian War, Dubois returned for a short period to France but after the peace treaty was signed in March 1871 he resumed his position with the Hohenzollern family.  He shared the position of head chef with his compatriot, Émile Bernard, with each being responsible for the cooking on alternate months. This arrangement gave Dubois time for writing. He remained in Berlin until 1880.

Personal life 
Dubois married Marie-Virginie-Louise Boder on 30 December 1868 in Potsdam. They had five children: Joseph-Émile, Albert-Félix, Ernest-Eugène, Julie-Marguerite and Jeannette-Hélène. The two eldest children were born before the marriage. His second son, Félix Dubois became a journalist.

Dubois died in Nice on 14 March 1901 at the age of 82. His wife lived for another 15 years.

Works 
 . Gallica: Volume 1, Volume 2
 . Link is to a scan of the 3rd edition published in 1872.
 .
 .
 . Link is to a scan of the 8th edition published in 1888.
 .
 .
 .
Translations into English
 .
 .
 .

Notes

References 
 .

 .

Further reading 
 .

1818 births
1901 deaths
French chefs